Matthew Radosevich, also known as Matt Rad, is an American record producer, songwriter, and musician. He has worked with artists such as One Direction, Niall Horan, Martin Garrix, Demi Lovato, Little Mix, Guy Sebastian, Lupe Fiasco, Walk the Moon, Thirty Seconds to Mars, The Hives, Boyz II Men, Chris Wallace, Pentatonix, and Dredg. He is half of the songwriting and production duo "Young Skeptics," along with Chris Wallace.

Select discography

References

External links

http://www.elementalmusic.us

Living people
Record producers from California
Year of birth missing (living people)